Andre Agassi was the defending champion, but did not participate this year.

Jim Courier won the title, defeating Mark Philippoussis 7–6(7–2), 6–4 in the final.

Seeds

  Todd Martin (semifinals)
  Jim Courier (champion)
  Stefan Edberg (semifinals)
  Patrick Rafter (second round)
  Aaron Krickstein (first round)
  Bernd Karbacher (second round)
  Javier Sánchez (first round)
  Mark Woodforde (quarterfinals)

Draw

Finals

Top half

Bottom half

External links
 Singles draw

Singles